Otoque Oriente is a corregimiento in Taboga District, Panamá Province, Panama with a population of 126 as of 2010. Its population as of 1990 was 210; its population as of 2000 was 199.

References

Corregimientos of Panamá Province